The 40th District of the Iowa Senate is located in southeastern Iowa, and is currently composed of Appanoose, Mahaska, Marion, Monroe, and Wapello Counties.

Current elected officials
Ken Rozenboom is the senator currently representing the 40th District.

The area of the 40th District contains two Iowa House of Representatives districts:
The 79th District (represented by Dustin Hite)
The 80th District (represented by Holly Brink)

The district is also located in Iowa's 2nd congressional district, which is represented by Mariannette Miller-Meeks.

Past senators
The district has previously been represented by:

Adolph Elvers, 1965–1966
Robert Rigler, 1967–1970
James W. Griffin, 1971–1972
Elizabeth Orr Shaw, 1973–1977
Edgar Holden, 1978–1982
George Kinley, 1983–1992
Albert Sorensen, 1993–1996
Jerry Behn, 1997–2002
Richard F. Drake, 2003–2004
James F. Hahn, 2005–2012
Ken Rozenboom, 2013–present

See also
Iowa General Assembly
Iowa Senate

References

40